Raziel Abelson (24 June 1921 – 14 June 2017) was an American academic. He served as Professor of Philosophy Emeritus at New York University and was a proponent of the Ordinary Language School of Philosophy.

Biography
He was born in Brooklyn, New York, the son of Rabbi Alter Abelson and Anna Goldina Schwartz.  His brother was the playwright Lionel Abel (1910–2001).

He received a M.A. from the University of Chicago in 1950 with the thesis "Bertrand Russell's theory of truth", and a Ph.D. in 1960  from New York University  with a thesis "An analysis of the concept of definition, and critique of three traditional philosophical views concerning its role in knowledge".

Abelson died in June 2017 at the age of 95.

Works
 Abelson, Raziel  Ethics and Metaethics NY: St Martin's, 1963 
 Abelson, Raziel. Lawless Mind. Philadelphia: Temple University Press, 1988.  
 Abelson, Raziel. Persons: A Study in Philosophical Psychology. New York: St. Martin's Press; London: Macmillan, 1977 
 Abelson, Raziel, Marie-Louise Friquegnon, and Michael Lockwood. The Philosophical Imagination New York: St Martins, 1977.
 Abelson, Raziel, and Marie-Louise Friquegnon. Ethics for Modern Life. New York: St. Martin's Press, 1975. According to WorldCat, the book is held in 1077 libraries
Abelson, Raziel." Common Sense Morality." New York: Global Scholarly Publications 2015

See also

 Lionel Abel
New York University Department of Philosophy

References 

1921 births
2017 deaths
20th-century American Jews
New York University alumni
New York University faculty
Philosophers from New York (state)
University of Chicago alumni
People from Brooklyn